A survey motor boat (abbreviated SMB), is a vessel equipped for commercial and/or military hydrographic survey operations.

References
Australian Hydrographic Service - frequently asked questions

Motorboats